William Hemsley may refer to:

 William Hemsley (politician) (1737–1812), American planter, Continental congressman from Maryland
 William Hemsley (botanist) (1843–1924), British botanist
 William Hemsley (painter) (1819–1906), British genre painter

See also
William Helmsley, Member of Parliament